Modła may refer to the following places in Poland:
Modła, Bolesławiec County in Lower Silesian Voivodeship (south-west Poland)
Modła, Głogów County in Lower Silesian Voivodeship (south-west Poland)
Modła, Łódź Voivodeship (central Poland)
Modła, Ciechanów County in Masovian Voivodeship (east-central Poland)
Modła, Mława County in Masovian Voivodeship (east-central Poland)
Modła, Kalisz County in Greater Poland Voivodeship (west-central Poland)
Modła, Konin County in Greater Poland Voivodeship (west-central Poland)
Modła, Pomeranian Voivodeship (north Poland)